Imeni Kirova may refer to:

Geography

Armenia
Imeni Kirova, Armenia

Azerbaijan
Bankə, Azerbaijan; formerly, Imeni Kirova
Yeni Suraxanı, Azerbaijan; formerly, Imeni Kirova
Kirov, Baku, Azerbaijan; formerly, Imeni Kirova

Kyrgyzstan
several places formerly named "Imeni Kirova", see Kirov (disambiguation)

Russia
Imeni Kirova, Russia, name of several rural localities in Russia